San Luis Potosí is a state in North Central Mexico that is divided into 58 municipalities. According to the 2020 Mexican Census, it is the  19th most populated of Mexico's 31 states, with  inhabitants and the 15th largest by land area spanning . The largest municipality by population is the city of San Luis Potosí, with 911,908 residents (32.31% of the state's total), while the smallest is Armadillo with 4,013 residents. The newest municipalities are El Naranjo, created out of Ciudad del Maíz, and Matlapa, carved from Tamazunchale, both established in 1994.

Municipalities in San Luis Potosi are administratively autonomous of the state according to the 115th article of the 1917 Constitution of Mexico. Every three years, citizens elect a municipal president (Spanish: presidente municipal) by a plurality voting system who heads a concurrently elected municipal council (ayuntamiento) responsible for providing all the public services for their constituents. The municipal council consists of a variable number of trustees and councillors (regidores y síndicos). Municipalities are responsible for public services (such as water and sewerage), street lighting, public safety, traffic, and the maintenance of public parks, gardens and cemeteries. They may also assist the state and federal governments in education, emergency fire and medical services, environmental protection and maintenance of monuments and historical landmarks. Since 1984, they have had the power to collect property taxes and user fees, although more funds are obtained from the state and federal governments than from their own income.

Municipalities

Notes

References

 
San Luis Potosi